Antonio Bruti (c. 1518 in Lezhë d. 1571 in Ulcinj) was an Albanian trader, agent, merchant and diplomat, part of the Bruti family, who worked for Venice in the cities of Ulcinj and Ragusa working with Venetian-Ottoman relations.

Family background
Bruti moved to Ulcinj in 1537 fleeing Ottomans. He had three sons; Bartolomeo, Benedetto and Jacomo. Bruti was married to Maria Bruni, of the Bruni family. Brutis brother, Antonio Bruni, was born in the 1550s. His son was Bartolomeo Bruti (1557-1591) who died in Moldavia from strangulation. Antonio Bruti was educated by the Jesuits.

Career
During his career, Bruti bargained with the Ottomans the grain necessary to feed Catholic Venice. The high costs of wheat caused "extreme misery" in the city of Venice forcing the governor of Budva to detain Antonios shipment of wheat. In 1560, Bruti sent a petition to Venice listing the services he had performed. He was Ulcinjs most prominent trader of grain. In 1537 Antonio Bruti commanded a military ship and fought for the defence of Ulcinj and Bar against the Ottomans. During his time in Ulcinj, he tried to shape and form the minds of the local Albanians to join Venice to oppose Ottoman rule In 1570 Antonio Bruti described the walls of Ulcinj as "weak and extremely dangerous" According to Venetian historian Andrea Morosini, Antonio Bruti had refused to surrender Ulcinj to the Ottomans and fearing hostility, he threw himself in the ocean and was later captured by Ali Muezinzade Pasha. Noel Malcolm believes that Antonio Bruti was on board on war ships in Corfu in July 1570. He died in 1571 when Ottomans sieged Ulcinj and killed him.

References 

1518 births
1571 deaths
Republic of Venice people of the Ottoman–Venetian Wars
People from Lezhë
16th-century Venetian people
Republic of Venice diplomats